James S. Lister (born 1895) was a Scottish footballer who played for Rangers, Dumbarton, Morton, Bury, Hartlepools United and Bournemouth. He was a centre forward.

References

1895 births
Scottish footballers
Rangers F.C. players
Dumbarton F.C. players
Greenock Morton F.C. players
Bury F.C. players
Renton F.C. players
Armadale F.C. players
Hartlepool United F.C. players
Bournemouth F.C. players
Scottish Football League players
English Football League players
Date of birth missing
Year of death missing
Association football forwards